Amesia may refer to:
 Amesia (moth), a genus of moths in the family Zygaenidae
 Amesia (fungus), a genus of fungi in the family Chaetomiaceae
 Amesia, a genus of plants in the family Orchidaceae, synonym of Epipactis